Gerben Löwik (born 29 June 1977 in Vriezenveen, Overijssel) is a Dutch former professional road bicycle racer.

Major results

1998
 1st ZLM Tour
 5th Road race, European Under-23 Road Championships
1999
 1st Stage 6 Sachsen Tour
2000
 9th Hel van het Mergelland
2001
 8th Veenendaal–Veenendaal
 9th Delta Profronde
2002
 5th Ronde van Midden-Zeeland
 6th Overall Tour of Sweden
 6th Le Samyn
 9th Tour Beneden-Maas
2003
 1st Overall Circuit Franco-Belge
1st Stage 1
 1st Overall Ster Elektrotoer
1st Points classification
 1st GP Stad Vilvoorde
 1st Stage 2 Deutschland Tour
 3rd Trofeo Alcudia
 3rd Tour Beneden-Maas
 4th Overall Grote Prijs Erik Breukink
1st Points classification
 6th GP Aarhus
 6th Grand Prix S.A.T.S.
 6th Grand Prix Pino Cerami
 7th Schaal Sels
 8th Rund um den Henninger Turm
 8th Luk-Cup Bühl
2004
 1st Overall Tour de Wallonie
 1st Profronde van Fryslan (with 21 others)
 3rd Overall Three Days of De Panne
 3rd Kuurne–Brussels–Kuurne
 4th Memorial Rik Van Steenbergen
 4th GP Stad Zottegem
 4th Nokere Koerse
 5th HEW Cyclassics
 5th Grand Prix d'Ouverture La Marseillaise
 6th GP Rudy Dhaenens
 8th Tour de Rijke
 10th Overall Circuit Franco-Belge
2005
 5th Veenendaal–Veenendaal
2006
 4th Overall Ster Elektrotoer
2008
 9th Trofeo Pollença
 10th Overall Giro della Provincia di Grosseto
2009
 7th Paris–Tours
 8th Gran Piemonte
 8th Grote Prijs Jef Scherens
 8th Grand Prix d'Isbergues
 9th Eschborn–Frankfurt

External links 
Personal website

1977 births
Living people
Dutch male cyclists
People from Vriezenveen
UCI Road World Championships cyclists for the Netherlands
Cyclists from Overijssel
20th-century Dutch people
21st-century Dutch people